Outside money is money that is not a liability for anyone "inside" the economy. It is held in an economy in net positive amounts. Examples are money that is backed by gold, and assets denominated in foreign currency or otherwise backed up by foreign debt, like foreign cash, stocks or bonds. Typically, the private economy is considered as the "inside", so government-issued money is also "outside money."

References

See also

Inside money

Monetary economics